Klinkerfues may refer to:
 Ernst Friedrich Wilhelm Klinkerfues (1827–1884), German astronomer
 112328 Klinkerfues, a main belt asteroid named after the astronomer
 Comet Klinkerfues (disambiguation)